Kim Edgar McQuilken (born February 26, 1951) is a former American football quarterback in the National Football League (NFL) for the Atlanta Falcons and Washington Redskins.  

Born in Allentown, Pennsylvania, McQuilken played college football at nearby Lehigh University, where he was first-team Division II All-American during his senior year in 1973. He was drafted in the third round of the 1974 NFL Draft by Atlanta, and installed as the Falcons' third-string quarterback, behind Bob Lee and Pat Sullivan. He got in five games his rookie season and started the last two, including a 10–3 win over Green Bay.

Statistically, McQuilken was one of the poorest passers in NFL history that actually received significant playing time; for his seven-year career, he had a 17.9 passer rating, second-worst ever among players with at least 200 attempts. He won only two of his seven starts as a Falcon, reaching his arguable nadir in a 1975 loss to the Minnesota Vikings, when McQuilken made 26 attempts with only five completions – and five interceptions. For his career, McQuilken would throw 29 picks against just four touchdowns, also one of the worst ratios in NFL history. In 1978, he went to the Washington Redskins as Joe Theismann's backup, appearing in just three games in 1979.

Out of football for three years, McQuilken, still popular in the Washington area, joined the Washington Federals of the United States Football League in their 1983 inaugural season and emerged as their opening-day starter. Ultimately he would complete 188-for-334 passes for 1,912 yards, seven touchdowns, and 14 interceptions for the season. However, the Feds would finish just 4–14 in front of small crowds, and the 32-year-old McQuilken retired.

NFL career statistics

Regular season

After football
McQuilken went on to become executive vice president of Cartoon Network, before leaving the network in 2006 to set up his own sports and entertainment marketing and licensing consulting business.

Notes

References

1951 births
Living people
American football quarterbacks
Atlanta Falcons players
Washington Redskins players
Washington Federals/Orlando Renegades players
Lehigh Mountain Hawks football players
Sportspeople from Allentown, Pennsylvania
Players of American football from Pennsylvania
Cartoon Network executives